The Naryn rises in the Tian Shan mountains in Kyrgyzstan, Central Asia, flowing west through the Fergana Valley into Uzbekistan. Here it merges with the Kara Darya (near Namangan) to form the Syr Darya.

The river contains many reservoirs which are important in the generation of hydroelectricity. The largest of these is the Toktogul Reservoir in Kyrgyzstan containing  of water. Dams downstream of the Toktogul in Kyrgyzstan include: Kürpsay, Tash-Kömür, Shamaldy-Say and Üch-Korgon. Upstream of Toktogul in Kyrgyzstan is the Kambar-Ata-2 and At-Bashy Dams while the Kambar-Ata-1 Dam is in planning stages.

Some places along the river: Kyrgyzstan: Kara-Say (see Barskoon), Naryn Region, Naryn, Dostuk, Jalal-Abad Region, Kazarman, Toktogul Reservoir, Kara-Köl, Tash-Kömür.

Tributaries
The main tributaries of the Naryn are, from source to mouth:

Kichi-Naryn (right)
On-Archa (right)
At-Bashy (left)
Kajyrty (right)
Ala-Buga (left)
Kökirim (left)
Kökömeren (right)
Chychkan (right)
Uzun-Akmat (right)
Kara-Suu (right)

See also
Karabulun Hydro Power Plant

References

External links
Rivers Network : Naryn river watersheds - webmap

Tributaries of the Syr Darya
Naryn Region
Jalal-Abad Region
Tian Shan